Ian Black may refer to:

 Ian Black (footballer, born 1924) (1924–2012), Scottish footballer
 Ian Black (footballer, born 1960), Scottish footballer
 Ian Black (footballer, born 1985), his son, Scottish footballer
 Ian Black (journalist), British The Guardian columnist, correspondent and leader writer
 Ian Black (meteorologist) (born 1962), weathercaster in Ottawa, Canada
 Ian Black (politician) (1943–2020), Australian politician
 Ian Black (priest) (born 1961), Dean of Newport, Wales, from 2021
 Ian Black (swimmer) (born 1941), Scottish swimmer, BBC Sports Personality of the Year 1958
 Ian Stuart Black (1915–1997), British television screenwriter
 Ian Black (snooker player) (1954–2006), Scottish snooker player
 Ian Black, former member of Field Music, currently frontman of Slug

See also
 Michael Ian Black (born 1971), American actor, comedian and comedy writer
 Iain Black (born 1967), Canadian politician in British Columbia